INS Sudarshini is a sail training ship built by Goa Shipyard Limited for the Indian Navy. The ship is a sister ship of INS Tarangini which was commissioned in 1997. "Sudarshini" means "beautiful lady Sundari" after the younger half-sister of Buddha. The ship was designed by Colin Mudie, a naval architect and yacht designer from the United Kingdom.

Design and construction
Sudarshini is a three-masted sailing ship with a barque rig. It is 54 metres long and has 20 sails, 7.5 km of rope and 1.5 km of steel wire rope. Capable of operations under sail or power, and with complement of five officers, 31 sailors and 30 cadets embarked for training, it can remain at sea for at least 20 days at a time.

Sudarshinis steel hull was launched on 25 January 2011 at the port town of Vasco da Gama, Goa on the west coast of India, and by then the major portion of work had been completed. It was commissioned in Indian Navy on 27 January 2012 by Vice Admiral K.N. Sushil, Flag Officer Commanding-in-Chief, Southern Naval Command. Built for worldwide operations, it will be used as a basic seamanship and character building platform.

Service history
Sudarshini started its first nine nation voyage of ASEAN countries on 15 September 2012 to trace the ancient route taken by Indian mariners to South East Asia. During the course of the 12,000 mile voyage, she visited 13 ports in 9 ASEAN countries. The ship visited the ports of Padang, Bali, Manado in Indonesia, Port Muara in Brunei, Cebu, Manila, Da Nang, Sihanoukville in Cambodia, Bangkok, Phuket in Thailand, Singapore, Port Klang in Malaysia and Sittwe in Myanmar. While on the voyage, the ship's embarked Indian Naval and Coast Guard cadets, as well as cadets from other ASEAN countries. During the ASEAN deployment, the commanding officer of Sudarshini, Commander N Shyam Sundar, wrote live blogs from sea. This was the first time the Indian Navy has used social media to promote a diplomatic naval voyage. The ship returned to its home port, Kochi, on 25 March 2013 and was greeted by the Defence Minister of India, A. K. Antony, the Chief of Southern Naval Command, Vice Admiral Satish Soni, ambassadors and heads of missions of ASEAN nations.

See also

Training ships of the Indian Navy
INS Tarangini
School ship
ASEAN–India Commemorative Summit
ASEAN-India Car Rally 2012

References

Barques of the Indian Navy
Tall ships of India
Training ships of the Indian Navy
Sail training ships
Ships built in India
Naval ships of India
Three-masted ships
Individual sailing vessels
2011 ships